WGOT-LP (100.1 FM) is a low power FM radio station that broadcasts from Gainesville, Florida, United States. WGOT-LP is operated as a community radio station by the Civic Media Center, a non-profit library in Gainesville.

History
The Civic Media Center first applied for a permit for a low-power FM station in 2001. The construction permit for WGOT-LP was granted in May 2005.
 
WGOT-LP originally broadcast on 94.7 MHz, sharing this frequency with WVFP-LP, owned by the Faith Presbyterian Church; and WGLJ-LP, owned by the Calvary Church Gainesville. The frequency was previously used by Free Radio Gainesville, a pirate radio station.

In January 2012 the station began streaming its audio online. Streaming was terminated due to copyright issues in October 2015.

Frequency change
On February 28, 2017, the station moved to 100.1 MHz to facilitate 24-hour operation.

Programming
WGOT-LP airs several locally produced programs and a weekly one-hour show produced by the Civic Media Center and Counterpoise volunteers.  The station is a Pacifica Radio affiliate and broadcasts several Pacifica programs, including Democracy Now! with Amy Goodman and Juan Gonzalez.

See also
List of community radio stations in the United States

References

External links
 WGOT official website
 
 WGOT MySpace page

GOT-LP
GOT-LP
Community radio stations in the United States
Radio stations established in 2008
Alachua County, Florida
Progressivism in the United States
2008 establishments in Florida